Idrissa Touré (born 29 April 1998) is a German professional footballer who plays as a midfielder for Serie B club Pisa. At international level, he represented Germany at under-18 and under-19 levels.

Club career

Youth
Touré played for Tennis Borussia Berlin before moving to RB Leipzig in 2015.

RB Leipzig II
Touré extended his contract with RB Leipzig on 16 February 2016 until 2019. He made his debut for RB Leipzig in a 2–1 win against TSV 1860 München on 13 March 2016. In October 2016, he, together with teammate Vitaly Janelt, was ousted from the club's academy following an incident on a national team trip.

Schalke 04 II
In January 2017, he moved to FC Schalke 04 where he played for the reserve team.

Werder Bremen II
In summer 2017, Touré signed with Werder Bremen II. In his first season with the team he made 35 appearances scoring two goals and making two assists. In May 2018 his performances earned him his first professional contract.

Juventus U23
In August 2018, Touré joined Juventus U23 on loan for the 2018–19 season. Juventus secured an option to sign him permanently. At the end of the season, Juventus decided to redeem the buying option and paid €1 million for the player.

On 3 September 2020, he joined Eredivisie club Vitesse on loan from Juventus.

Pisa
Touré joined Serie B club Pisa permanently in July 2021, having agreed a contract until 2025.

International career
Touré was the captain of Germany U18 national team, playing 9 times. For the U19 team, he made 3 appearances scoring 1 goal.

Personal life
Touré was born in Berlin to Guinean parents and has four siblings.

Career statistics

Honours
Juventus U23
 Coppa Italia Serie C: 2019–20

References

External links
 
 

1998 births
Living people
Footballers from Berlin
Association football midfielders
German footballers
Germany youth international footballers
German people of Guinean descent
RB Leipzig players
RB Leipzig II players
FC Schalke 04 II players
SV Werder Bremen II players
Juventus Next Gen players
Juventus F.C. players
SBV Vitesse players
Pisa S.C. players
2. Bundesliga players
3. Liga players
Regionalliga players
Serie C players
Eredivisie players
German expatriate footballers
German expatriate sportspeople in Italy
Expatriate footballers in Italy
German expatriate sportspeople in the Netherlands
Expatriate footballers in the Netherlands